Stempfferia ginettae is a butterfly in the family Lycaenidae. It is found in the Central African Republic, the Democratic Republic of the Congo and Zambia.

Subspecies
Stempfferia ginettae ginettae (Central African Republic, Democratic Republic of the Congo)
Stempfferia ginettae meridionalis Libert, 1999 (Democratic Republic of the Congo, Zambia)

References

Butterflies described in 1999
Poritiinae